Sedgman is a surname.  Notable people with the surname include:

 Alethea Sedgman (born 1994), Australian sport shooter
 Frank Sedgman (born 1927), Australian tennis player